Ahmet Muzaffer Kılıç (1897–1959) was a Turkish soldier during the Turkish Liberation War, a member of the Turkish National Movement, and a politician of the Republic of Turkey.

References 

1897 births
1959 deaths
Military personnel from Istanbul
People of the Turkish War of Independence
Members of Kuva-yi Milliye
20th-century Turkish politicians
Republican People's Party (Turkey) politicians
Politicians from Istanbul